Spacefarers Guide to Alien Races is a 1979 role-playing game supplement published by Phoenix Games.

Contents
Spacefarers Guide to Alien Races details 100 different alien races for use in creating characters for science fiction role-playing games.

Reception
William A. Barton reviewed Spacefarers Guide to Alien Races in The Space Gamer No. 33. Barton commented that "If a myriad of alien races from which to choose a character for your next SF role-playing session is your cup of zgwortz, Spacefarers Guide to Alien Races should easily suit you as well as a tentacle does your typical BEM."

References

Role-playing game supplements introduced in 1979
Science fiction role-playing game supplements